Legal Acts of the European Union are laws which are adopted by the Institutions of the European Union in order to exercise the powers given to them by the EU Treaties. They come in five forms: regulations, directives, decisions, recommendations and opinions.

Regulations and directives can be either legislative or non-legislative acts. Legislative acts are normally adopted by the Council of the European Union and the European Parliament acting together, and have their legal basis in the treaties. Non-legislative acts are adopted by the European Commission in pursuance with powers given to it by legislative acts. Their function is to fill in the detail omitted by legislative acts.

Kinds
 A regulation becomes immediately enforceable as law in all member states simultaneously. It can be considered as equivalent to a pan-European act of parliament.
 A directive requires member states to achieve a particular result without dictating the means of achieving that result.
 A decision is binding in its entirety. A decision which specifies those to whom it is addressed is only binding on them.
 Recommendations and opinions are non-binding.

See also
 EUR-Lex European Union legal acts
 Law of the European Union

References

European Union law